Lorenzini is an Italian surname. Notable people with the surname include:

 Antonio Lorenzini (1655–1740), Italian painter and engraver, active in Bologna and in Florence
 Carlo Lorenzini (1826–1890), pen name C. Collodi, Florentine children's writer known for the fairy tale The Adventures of Pinocchio
 Carola Lorenzini  (1889–1941), Argentine aviator
 Cedric Lorenzini, French bridge player
 Davide Lorenzini (born 1969), Italian diver
 Edmondo Lorenzini (1938–2020), Italian footballer
 Eldora Lorenzini (1910–1993), American painter
 John Lorenzini (born 1956), former Australian rules footballer
 Julio César Lorenzini (born 1977), Mexican politician and lawyer
 Kena Lorenzini (born 1959), Chilean photographer, writer, and activist
 Orlando Lorenzini (1890–1941), Italian general during World War II
 Pietro Lorenzini (born 1989), Italian footballer
 Roberto Lorenzini (born 1966), Italian footballer and coach
 Stefano Lorenzini (fl. 1652–1678), Italian physician and noted ichthyologist
 Vance Lorenzini, American production designer of television commercials and music videos

See also
 Ampullae of Lorenzini, special sensing organs, forming a network of jelly-filled canals in cartilaginous fishes

Italian-language surnames
Patronymic surnames
Surnames from given names
it:Lorenzini